This is a list of airlines which have an Air Operator Certificate issued by the Civil Aviation Authority  of Romania.

Scheduled airlines

Charter airlines

See also 
List of defunct airlines of Romania
List of airlines

References

Airlines
Romania
Airlines
Romania